Chariton County Courthouse was a historic courthouse located at Keytesville, Chariton County, Missouri. It was built in 1866, and was a two-story, white-painted, brick, rectangular building.  It was destroyed by fire on August 27, 1973.

It was listed on the National Register of Historic Places in 1971 and delisted in 1974.

References

Former National Register of Historic Places in Missouri
Courthouses on the National Register of Historic Places in Missouri
County courthouses in Missouri
Government buildings completed in 1866
Buildings and structures in Chariton County, Missouri
National Register of Historic Places in Chariton County, Missouri